Ana Fidelia Quirot Moré (born March 23, 1963) is a former track and field athlete from Cuba, who specialised in the 800 metres but was also successful over 400 m. At 800 metres, she is a two-time World Champion (1995, 1997) and a two-time Olympic medallist (1992, 1996). Her best time of 1:54.44 from 1989 still ranks her fifth on the world all-time list. She is regarded as one of the best female 800m runners of all time, and probably the best to not have an Olympic gold medal in the event.

Career
Quirot was born in Palma Soriano, Cuba. In 1983, she won a silver medal in the 400 metres at the Pan American Games in Caracas, running 51.83. Four years later at the Pan American Games in Indianapolis, she won both the 400m and 800m. In the 400m, she ran 50.27 to defeat Canada's Jillian Richardson, while in the 800m she defeated Delisa Walton-Floyd of the US in 1:59.06. Later that year at the 1987 World Championships in Rome, she improved her 800m best 1:55.84, to finish fourth in a high quality final. She ran onto the leader in the final bend to make a bid for winning the race, but ended up tiring and fading to 4th in the home stretch. The race was won by East Germany's Sigrun Wodars in 1:55.32.

In 1988 she was favored to win the 800 metres gold medal as she went undefeated in the event that season, including winning meetings with her two main rivals and the Olympic Gold and silver medalists Sigrun Wodars and Christine Wachtel, and favored to win a medal in the 400 metres. However, the Cuban boycott prevented her from competing. She was ranked #1 for the year for 800 metres and #4 for 400 metres.

At the 1989 IAAF World Cup in Barcelona, Quirot reached her peak at 800 metres. In a race that was fast from the start, thanks to the front running of World and Olympic champion Wodars, Quirot won in 1:54.44, to move to (at the time) third on the world all-time list behind world-record holder Jarmila Kratochvilova and 1980 Olympic champion Nadezhda Olizarenko. She also won the 400m, after original winner Marie-Jose Perec was disqualified for running out of her lane. In 1990, she again achieved a 400m, 800m double, this time at the Goodwill Games in Seattle. She won the 400m in 50.38 and the 800m in 1:57.42, narrowly ahead of the Soviet Union's Liliya Nurutdinova, who ran 1:57.52. She was ranked #1 for the year for both the 400m and 800m.

Quirot was unbeaten at the 800 metres for almost three years, from her fourth place at the 1987 Worlds, to the Zurich Grand Prix in August 1990, when she was third behind the East German pair of Wodars and Christine Wachtel. This lone defeat bumped her down the 3rd in the Track and Field News 800m rankings, as it was her only meeting with the two women in 1990, after having been ranked 1st in both 1988 and 1989. She did however rank #1 for the year in the 400 metres (for the 2nd and final time) in 1990, making her the only women in history thus far (as of 2017) to rank #1 in the world multiple years in both the 400m and 800m.

Going in as clear favorite she settled for a silver medal at the 1991 World Championships in Tokyo, narrowly losing to Nurutdinova 1:57.50 to 1:57.55. The first 4 finishers were within 0.13 of a second and closely crowded in each other's paths at the end, with bronze medalist Kovacs sprawling across the line, blocking the path of 4th-place finisher Maria Mutola who may have otherwise won the race. Quirot did manage a 4–1 record vs Nurutdinova for 1991, and a clear winning record against all her main competitors (although had 5 2nd place losses to 5 different women) and regained her #1 ranking over 800 metres in the final Track and Field News yearly rankings.

Prevented from competing at the 1984 and 1988 Olympic Games due to the Cuban boycotts, Quirot made her Olympic debut at the 1992 games in Barcelona, where she won a bronze medal in the 800 m behind Ellen van Langen and Nurutdinova. Ana had gone into the race as the gold medal favorite, with Nurutdinova tipped as her biggest rival, and Lyubov Gurina, Ella Kovacs, and young Maria Mutola also viewed as real contenders, but the overlooked Van Langen took victory from the favorites, slipping past a tiring Nurutdinova on the inside 50 metres from the finish.

In 1993, she was involved in a domestic accident that left her seriously injured. She was pregnant at the time and gave birth to her daughter prematurely in hospital while fighting for her life. Her daughter did not survive and died a week after she was born.

Quirot returned from her accident in late 1993 and won a silver medal in the Central America Games, behind the Suriname athlete Letitia Vriesde. Then in 1995, at the World Championships in Gothenburg, she became World champion for the first time ever, defeating Vriesde and Kelly Holmes, who were second and third respectively. To gain victory she used a strong finishing kick to move from 5th to 1st down the stretch, something that comes largely from her background of also being a long-time top 400 metre runner. Maria Mutola was heavily favored, having been on a 3-year unbeaten streak, but stepped on a lane marker in the semis, being disqualified. Mutola would be victorious in all head-to-head encounters between her and Ana over 800 metres this year, including the season-ending grand prix final where Mutola would place 1st to Quirot's 5th.

Quirot won her second Olympic medal at the 1996 Olympic Games in Atlanta, winning silver. She went in as one of the top two favorites, along with Maria Mutola, and a battle between the two greats was widely anticipated, with Kelly Holmes also considered a possible gold medal contender. She ultimately defeated both Mutola and Holmes, but ended being pipped for the gold in a major upset by Svetlana Masterkova, who had returned to the sport in 1996, after two years away to have a baby. She was disappointed, knowing at age 33 she had likely missed her last chance of an Olympic Gold, but considered it a triumph after the adversity she had faced to get there. She blamed a poor tactical race on her defeat, and likely lost the race when she allowed Holmes to pass her on the back stretch, slipping back to 4th, rather than responding by moving onto the leader Masterkova's shoulder before the final bend. She would hand Masterkova her only defeat of the year at 800 metres a few weeks later. Track and Field News ranked her #2 for the year at 800 metres, behind Masterkova, but ahead of Mutola.

In 1997, Quirot retained her World title at the 1997 World Championships in Athens, with Yelena Afanasyeva second and Mutola third.  She was named the No. 1 ranked 800m runner for the year for the 4th and final time, and her first time since 1991. She trailed her chief rival Mutola 4–3 in head-to-head meetings this year, but was ranked 1st due to winning more important encounters at the World Championship, Grand Prix Finale, and for going under 1:55 in Cologne.

Quirot is one of only seven female athletes who have run under 1:55 for 800m, and was the only female to do so over a 25-year span from 1983 (Kratochvílová) to 2008 (Pamela Jelimo). Her best time of 1:54.44 from 1989 ranks her fifth on the world all-time list behind Kratochvilova, Olizarenko, Jelimo and Caster Semenya. She also ran 1:54.82 to beat Maria Mutola in a Grand Prix race in Cologne in 1997. Her lifetime best for 400m is 49.61 in 1991. In her final year of 1997 she would be ranked #1 in the world over 800 metres by Track and Field News, a feat she had last managed much earlier in 1988, 1989, and 1991. Mutola won 4 of 7 encounters with Quirot that year, but Quirot had the more prestigious victories: World Championships, her sub 1:55 clocking, and the IAAF Grand Prix final.

Personal bests

Competition record

References

External links

 a brief biography in French
   a blog with photo of Quirot taken on 1 May 2007.

1963 births
Living people
People from Palma Soriano
Cuban female sprinters
Cuban female middle-distance runners
Olympic athletes of Cuba
Olympic silver medalists for Cuba
Olympic bronze medalists for Cuba
Athletes (track and field) at the 1992 Summer Olympics
Athletes (track and field) at the 1996 Summer Olympics
Medalists at the 1992 Summer Olympics
Medalists at the 1996 Summer Olympics
Pan American Games gold medalists for Cuba
Pan American Games medalists in athletics (track and field)
Athletes (track and field) at the 1979 Pan American Games
Athletes (track and field) at the 1983 Pan American Games
Athletes (track and field) at the 1987 Pan American Games
Athletes (track and field) at the 1991 Pan American Games
World Athletics Championships athletes for Cuba
World Athletics Championships medalists
Pan American Games silver medalists for Cuba
Olympic silver medalists in athletics (track and field)
Olympic bronze medalists in athletics (track and field)
Universiade medalists in athletics (track and field)
Central American and Caribbean Games gold medalists for Cuba
Competitors at the 1986 Central American and Caribbean Games
Competitors at the 1990 Central American and Caribbean Games
Goodwill Games medalists in athletics
Track & Field News Athlete of the Year winners
Universiade gold medalists for Cuba
IAAF World Athlete of the Year
World Athletics Championships winners
Central American and Caribbean Games medalists in athletics
Medalists at the 1989 Summer Universiade
Competitors at the 1990 Goodwill Games
Medalists at the 1979 Pan American Games
Medalists at the 1983 Pan American Games
Medalists at the 1987 Pan American Games
Medalists at the 1991 Pan American Games
Olympic female sprinters